Fırat is a Turkish surname

Notable persons with that name include:
 Abdülmelik Fırat (1934–2009), Turkish-Kurdish politician
 Dengir Mir Mehmet Fırat (1943–2019), Turkish politician 
 Duygu Fırat (born 1990), Turkish female basketball player
 Engin Fırat (born 1970), Turkish football manager
 Ertuğrul Oğuz Fırat (1923–2014), Turkish composer, painter and writer
 Gökçe Fırat Çulhaoğlu (born 1974), Turkish journalist
 İbrahim Halil Fırat (born 1973), Turkish politician
 İdil Fırat (born 1972), Turkish actress
 Mert Fırat (born 1981), Turkish actor and screenwriter
 Nurhan Fırat (born 1972), Turkish karateka
 Salih Fırat (born 1960), Turkish-Kurdish politician
 Yusuf Emre Fırat (born 2000), Turkish cross-country skier

Turkish-language surnames